CKBT-FM is a Canadian radio station broadcasting at 91.5 FM in Kitchener, Ontario. The station broadcasts a CHR/Top 40 format branded as 91.5 The Beat, with studios & offices located in Kitchener, However, its transmitter is south of Ayr. The station is owned by Corus Entertainment.

History
The station was launched by CanWest Global on January 31, 2004. The original studios were at 235 King Street East, Suite 120, Kitchener. The station originally aired a Rhythmic Top 40 format (e.g. hip hop, reggae and R&B), until switching to its current format in 2007.

In September 2006, Corus Entertainment, already owner of CJDV-FM in nearby Cambridge, announced it would buy CKBT and Winnipeg's CJZZ-FM (now CFPG-FM) from CanWest, subject to Canadian Radio-television and Telecommunications Commission (CRTC) approval. The transaction was approved by the CRTC on July 6, 2007, and as of July 29, 2007, CKBT was officially made part of Corus Entertainment's radio properties.

On August 14, 2009, CKBT moved into a new broadcast facility with sister station CJDV-FM at 50 Sportsworld Crossing Road, Kitchener.

References

External links
 91.5 The Beat 
 
 

Kbt
Kbt
Kbt
Radio stations established in 2004
2004 establishments in Ontario